Salimah Ali (born 1954) is an American contemporary photographer working in portraiture, documentary photography, and photo journalism.

Early life and education 
Ali was born in 1954 in Harlem, New York City. She spent her childhood in Manhattan, Brooklyn, and Queens. Her interest in art was shaped from a young age by her father, an oil painter, who bought Ali her first camera.

After beginning her photography career by shooting photos of babies and newlyweds, Ali got her first break while studying at LaGuardia Community College. She saw a poster advertising an Eddie Kendricks concert and contacted the show's promoter to ask if she could photograph the Kendricks. The promoter told her yes, and that opened the door for Ali to continue photographing other musicians, including Stevie Wonder; Patti LaBelle; Earth, Wind, and Fire; Bob Marley; and others.

Ali later transferred to the Fashion Institute of Technology, where she earned an associate's degree in photography.

Career 
Ali's work has appeared in a number of publications, including Essence, Black Enterprise, USA Today, The New York Times, Los Angeles Times, and The Washington Post.

Ali is a member of Kamoinge, a New York–based collective of African American photographers. The group works to present honest portrayals of the African American experience through photography. In 2007, they got a grant to photograph the aftermath of Hurricane Katrina. Ali participated in the project, taking photographs of New Orleans residents alongside the remains of their devastated homes.

Since 2001, Ali has also worked professionally as a photographer for the New York City Police Department.

Selected exhibitions 
In 2018, an installation of Ali's photographs were shown at the Queens Library. In 2019, Ali participated in a large group show at the African American Museum in Philadelphia. In 2020, Ali showed in "Visions 1020," a photography exhibition at Wilmer Jennings Kenkeleba Gallery in the East Village, Manhattan.

References 

African-American women artists
African-American contemporary artists
American contemporary artists
Living people
African-American photographers
Artists from New York City
1954 births
21st-century African-American people
20th-century African-American people
20th-century African-American women
21st-century African-American women
20th-century American women photographers
20th-century American photographers
21st-century American women photographers
21st-century American photographers